LM5: The Tour was the third worldwide concert tour and sixth overall held by British girl group Little Mix. The tour began on 16 September 2019 at the WiZink Centre, in Madrid, Spain and concluded on November 22, 2019, at The O2 Arena in London, England, in support of their fifth studio album, LM5 (2018).

'The LM5 Tour' received positive reviews from critics with praise given to its messages of feminism, and female empowerment. It was the group's last tour to feature former member Jesy Nelson, after parting ways with the group in December 2020. The tour consisted of 40 sold-out shows across Europe, and grossed over $27 million worldwide. Following their five sold out dates at The O2 Arena, in London Little Mix received an award by the 02 Arena, in recognition for their five headlined shows at the venue. They have headlined the venue a total of 12 times across from four tours, and sold over 184,000 tickets. A concert film of the tour was later released in cinemas worldwide on 21 November 2020 titled LM5: The Tour Film.

Background 
Little Mix announced the tour on 18 October 2018 via their Twitter account. A second round of shows was announced on 25 October 2018. However, a planned date in Aberdeen on 4 October 2019 was subsequently cancelled due to unforeseen logistical issues. An extra date was added at Porsche-Arena, Stuttgart due to popular demand at 22 September 2019. On 21 March 2019 a new date was added on the Europe leg, 28 September 2019 at Dôme de Paris, Paris. In March 2019, dates in Australia were announced. The following month, it was announced the group would co-headline the Fusion Festival UK in September, alongside Rudimental. In June 2019, the group's tour dates in Oceania were delayed, due to the release of "Bounce Back" That same month, a date in New Zealand was announced. The Oceania shows were cancelled in October.

In August 2019, it was announced that Keelie Walker would serve as a supporting act for European dates, while Mae Muller and New Rules would serve as supporting for the group's Ireland and United Kingdom dates.

During the last show at the O2 Arena in London, the full show was recorded for a concert film. On 8 October 2020, Little Mix announced on their social media that they will be releasing their first concert film titled LM5: The Tour Film together with the official poster of the film. The film premiered in cinemas worldwide on 21 November 2020.

Critical reception
The LM5 Tour received positive reviews from critics with The Times giving their tour a four out of five star rating. Minnie Wright from at Daily Express said "The tour is a fiery showcase of well-meaning (and often brilliantly pitched) empowerment messaging, and throughout which the band convey an authentic unity. The bonus delight, however, comes in the form of the shining punctuating moments in which they deliver divine four-part harmonies to perfection; soft and belting numbers alike, leaving no doubt as to the talent which underpins their success.

Emily Baker from Inews gave their tour tour a four out of five star rating. They said "It marked the first of a sold-out three-night run at London’s O2 which many great moments promoting self love and feminism throughout the night. The LM5 tour recalls Beyonce’s most famous shows, with encouraging messages about feminism activism scattered throughout the unignorable visuals. It’s clear the band want fans to see their concerts not just as a night of infectious pop, but as a movement to effect change. Whether the 9-year-old girls in light up bunny ears will take their messages on board is yet to be seen, but you have to applaud them for trying".

Laura Hernández from Okdiario, who was at the first show in Madrid, wrote "the importance of women's empowerment was present, from the beginning, at their concert". Hernández continued to highlight "the spectacular medley of "Only You" with "Black Magic" [...] so well they combined it so it looked like a single song. The lighting, the play of lights and the stage shine like never". She concluded her review by saying "after an hour and a half of a show simply brilliant, spectacular and as few have seen in Spain, the girls of Little Mix said goodbye to their Spanish audience. On numerous occasions they made it clear that they had not had such an extremely large audience so delivered for a long time. They love Spain and, once again, it has been shown that we also love them." Also about the first show of the tour, Agustín Gómez Cascales from the Spanish gay magazine Shangay, wrote that "they exceeded the expectations of most attendees with a show as entertaining as, at times, powerful".
Simon Duke at Chronicle Live said "Like many other pop acts, Little Mix don’t get anywhere near enough credit for their vocals but any doubters should be immediately silenced by the double header of The Cure and Secret Love Song, the latter with its soaring notes as it builds to a goosebumps inducing crescendo. The epic ballad, which has now become an anthem for the LGBT+ community, provided one of the big highlights of the night as the girls flew over their captive audience as rainbow confetti burst from cannons."

Matteo Rossini from Sky TG24, attended the show in Milan, stated that "the group has set up a show where girl power and messages to support the LGBTQ+ community have been the common denominator between pop music, amazing choreographies, extraordinary vocal performances and innovative visuals with attention to the smallest details".

Sheena McStravick from Belfast Live gave the opening night of the UK and Ireland leg at Belfast a positive review, stating that "messages of female empowerment featured heavily in the show which saw the four ladies barely take a breath as they belted out hit after hit and simultaneously performed high energy dance routines keeping up with their incredible backing dancers at all times".

Nola Ojomu from Metro gave the second London show four out of five stars, stating that "the nearly two hour-long show kicked off a trio of powerful pop bangers in the form of 'Salute,' 'Power' and 'Woman Like Me.' From the moment they hit the stage, the girls dance their hearts out without messing up a single note".

Accolades
On 22 November 2019, Little Mix received an award by the 02 Arena, for their five headlined shows at the venue for their LM5: The Tour. They had headlined the venue a total of 12 times from across four tours, and sold over 184,000 tickets.

On 17 January 2020, the LM5 The Tour’ dates at the SSE Hydro in Glasgow, was nominated at the SSE Live Awards 2019.
{| class="wikitable sortable plainrowheaders"
|+List of awards and nominations for "LM5: The Tour"
|-
! scope="col" | Year
! scope="col" | Award ceremony
! scope="col" | Category
! scope="col" | Result
! scope="col" class="unsortable" | 
|-
| align="center"| 2019
| rowspan="1"| 02 Arena
| rowspan="1"| 12 headline shows at the 02 Arena
| 
| align="center"|
|-

Set list
This set list is a representation of all the concerts in the UK. After the first show of the UK leg "The Cure" and "Secret Love Song, Pt.II" were switched.

 "The National Manthem"
 "Salute"
 "Power"
 "Woman Like Me"
 "Wasabi"
 "Bounce Back"
 "Only You" / "Black Magic"
 "Strip" 
 "Told You So"
 "Secret Love Song,Pt II"
 "The Cure"
 "Joan of Arc"
 "Wings"
 "Shout Out to My Ex"
 "Woman's World"
 "Forget You Not" 
 "Reggaetón Lento (Remix)"
 "No More Sad Songs"
 "Think About Us"
Encore
 "More Than Words"
 "Touch"

Notes
 During the third and fifth shows in London, Little Mix were joined by Stormzy to perform "Power".

Tour dates

Cancelled shows

References

Citations

Notes 

2019 concert tours
Concert tours of Australia
Concert tours of Europe
Little Mix concert tours